This article is a list of bands and musical artists described as playing djent. Djent is a subgenre of progressive metal, distinguished by a high-gain, distorted, palm-muted, low-pitch guitar sound. The name "djent" is an onomatopoeia of this sound.

Artists

References 

Djent
Lists of heavy metal bands